The Fort Hancock–El Porvenir International Bridge is an international bridge which crosses the Rio Grande connecting the United States–Mexico border cities of Fort Hancock, Texas and El Porvenir, Chihuahua. The Fort Hancock Port of Entry is located on the Texas side of the bridge and connects to Farm to Market Road 1088.

Border crossing

The Fort Hancock Port of Entry was established when the first bridge was built by the International Boundary and Water Commission in 1936.

See also
List of crossings of the Rio Grande

References

International bridges in Texas
International bridges in Chihuahua (state)
Bridges completed in 1936
Buildings and structures in Hudspeth County, Texas
Transportation in Hudspeth County, Texas
Road bridges in Texas
1936 establishments in Mexico
1936 establishments in Texas